Late Night in the Studio (titled on-screen as CBC Late Night in the Studio) is a Canadian comedy anthology web series produced for the CBC Gem streaming service.

The series is presented as a retrospective look at (non-existent) CBC Television programs of the past. Each episode runs 9 to 13 minutes, and is introduced by Nobu Adilman, who portrays the head archivist of the CBC.

The Globe and Mail'''s television critic John Doyle said the series was "highly recommended; satire as strange as what we need right now".

 Episodes 

 References 

 External links 
 Late Night in the Studio''

Anthology web series
Canadian comedy web series
2020s Canadian comedy television series
2020 Canadian television series debuts
CBC Gem original programming
2020 web series debuts
2020 web series endings
Television series set in the 1960s
Television series set in the 1970s
Television series set in the 1980s
Television series set in the 2000s